The polygon moray (Gymnothorax polygonius) is a moray eel of the family Muraenidae, found in the eastern Atlantic from Madeira and Cape Verde, and the western central Atlantic from Cuba and the Trindade Island (Brazil), at depths down to 50 m, in coastal waters.  Its length is up to  TL.

References

 

Gymnothorax
Fish of the Atlantic Ocean
Fauna of Macaronesia
Fish described in 1875